Herman Larsen (18 July 1899 – 3 March 1962) was a Danish hurdler. He competed in the men's 400 metres hurdles at the 1928 Summer Olympics.

References

1899 births
1962 deaths
Athletes (track and field) at the 1928 Summer Olympics
Danish male hurdlers
Olympic athletes of Denmark
Place of birth missing